The finals and the qualifying heats of the Men's 100 metres Individual Medley event at the 1998 European Short Course Swimming Championships were held on the first day of the competition, on Friday 11 December 1998 in Sheffield, England.

Finals

Qualifying Heats

References
 Results
 Swimsite

M